William Leslie "Mick" Dunn (28 February 1897 – 24 June 1966) was an Australian rules footballer who played with Carlton in the Victorian Football League (VFL).

Notes

External links 

Mick Dunn's profile at Blueseum

		
1897 births		
1966 deaths		
Australian rules footballers from South Australia		
Carlton Football Club players